Tallinn Music School is a music school in Tallinn, Estonia.

Before its independence the music school for children was a part of Tallinn Conservatory. In 1944 children's section got its independence. Until 1991 the school was called "Tallinn Children's Music School".

Directors

 1944-1948 Vladimir Alumäe
 1948-1951 Bruno Lukk
 1951-1952 Georg Ots
 1952-1954 Eugen Kapp
 Ellen Kansa

References

External links
 

Music schools in Estonia
Schools in Tallinn